Atlee Anthony Mahorn (born 27 October 1965) is a three-time Canadian Olympic and four-time World Championship  sprinter. He won Bronze medals in the 200 metres at the 1991 World Championships in Tokyo and the 4 x 100 metre relay at the 1993 World Championships in Stuttgart.  He won the gold medal in the 200m at the 1986 Commonwealth Games in Edinburgh.

His personal best time of 20.17 in the 200 metres was set in the semi-finals at the 1991 World Championships which was a Canadian record until Aaron Brown broke the record on 30 May 2014.

Born in Clarendon, Jamaica, Mahorn is a graduate of University of California, Berkeley and holds the school records in the 100 metres and 200 metres plus the number two times at 400 metres and as a member of a 4x100 metres relay.  He received an MBA in International Business. Mahorn is fluent in the French language and can also communicate in both Spanish and Italian.

Achievements

References

External links
 
 
 
 
 
 

1965 births
Living people
Canadian male sprinters
Olympic track and field athletes of Canada
Athletes (track and field) at the 1984 Summer Olympics
Athletes (track and field) at the 1988 Summer Olympics
Athletes (track and field) at the 1992 Summer Olympics
Commonwealth Games gold medallists for Canada
Athletes (track and field) at the 1986 Commonwealth Games
Athletes (track and field) at the 1994 Commonwealth Games
Commonwealth Games medallists in athletics
World Athletics Championships medalists
World Athletics Championships athletes for Canada
Universiade medalists in athletics (track and field)
Jamaican emigrants to Canada
Black Canadian track and field athletes
People from Clarendon Parish, Jamaica
Universiade silver medalists for Canada
Medalists at the 1985 Summer Universiade
Medallists at the 1986 Commonwealth Games